Trần Quốc Thiên (born 9 April 1988) is a Vietnamese singer who won the second season of Vietnam Idol in 2008–2009.

Vietnam Idol 
Quốc Thiên auditioned for Vietnam Idol in Ho Chi Minh City. He proceeded into top 10 and won the title over Thanh Duy on 14 January 2009 with 61 percent of the votes. Upon winning the competition, he was awarded $10,000 and signed a recording contract with recording company Music Face.

Vietnam Idol performances 
"Lời Yêu Xa" – An Hiếu – Studio Round 1
"Về Ăn Cơm" – Sa Huỳnh – Studio Round 3
"Cánh buồm phiêu du" – Sơn Thạch – Top 10
"Ngôi sao nhỏ" – Tường Văn – Top 9
"Dư âm" – Nguyễn Văn Tý – Top 8
"Son" – Đức Nghĩa – Top 7
"Rock Sài Gòn" – Lâm Quốc Cường – Top 6
"Nửa vầng trăng" – Nhật Trung – Top 5
"Tình yêu lung linh" – Hoài An – Top 5
"Bài thánh ca buồn" – Nguyễn Vũ – Top 4
"Ước mơ cho ngày mai" – Anh Tuấn – Top 4
"Mẹ tôi" – Nhị Hà – Top 3
"Guitar cho ta" – Lê Minh Sơn – Top 3
"Điệp khúc mùa xuân" – Quốc Dũng – Top 3
"Yêu Đời" with Thanh Duy – Nguyễn Dân – Top 2
"Dấu tình sầu" – Ngô Thuỵ Miên – Top 2
"Không còn mùa thu" – Quốc Bảo – Top 2
"Em sẽ là giấc mơ" – Lưu Thiên Hương – Top 2
"Vẫn hoài ước mơ" with Top 10 Idols – Đức Vượng – Grand Finale
"Điệp khúc mùa xuân" with Thanh Duy – Quốc Dũng – Grand Finale
"Áo xanh" with Lê Tuấn, Phi Trường and Thanh Duy – Tuấn Khanh – Grand Finale
"Son" – Đức Nghĩa – Grand Finale
"Một mình" with Quang Dũng – Thanh Tùng – Grand Finale
"Nụ cười và những ước mơ" – Đức Trí – Grand Finale

References

1988 births
Living people
Asian Idol
Vietnam Idol
Idols (TV series) winners
21st-century Vietnamese male singers
The Amazing Race contestants